Lalya Sidibé (born March 15, 1991 in Bondy, France) is a French basketball player who played for club Challes Les Eaux of the League feminine de basket the top basketball league for women in France during the 2009–2011 seasons.

References

External links
 www.basketlfb.com SIDIBE Lalya

French women's basketball players
1991 births
Living people
Sportspeople from Bondy